Tony Holden may refer to:

 Tony Holden (Home and Away), a character from the Australian soap opera Home and Away
 Tony Holden (director), television producer and director

See also
 Anthony Holden (born 1947), English writer, broadcaster and critic